The New York AO Krete was a soccer team based in New York City.

History

On June 24, 1984, the club defeated the Chicago Croatian in the final and was the champion of the 1984 National Challenge Cup.

Honors
National Challenge Cup
Winner (1): 1984

References

Defunct soccer clubs in New York (state)
U.S. Open Cup winners